The Race of Champions is a racing organization owned by 1670 Sports and Entertainment as of 2016. The Race of Champions is a racing organization eight different series (Seven on Asphalt, One on Dirt).

The Race of Champions race/weekend 

The Race of Champions is a yearly stock car race using modified race cars. The Race of Champions is the successor to the Langhorne National Open, and uses the 1951-1971 opens as the first 21 RoC events. Champions from weekly racetracks throughout the Northeast and Southeast are awarded guaranteed starting positions. Large fields of cars from many states attempt to qualify for each Race of Champions. The 1972-76 RoC events were held at Trenton Speedway. Five different drivers won the five RoC events at Trenton. From 1977 to 1991, Pocono Raceway hosted the Race of Champions. From 1977 to 1979, the race was held on the 2.5 mile triangular superspeedway; from 1980 to 1991, the three-quarter-mile infield oval was used.  Richie Evans and George Kent were the leading winners, each winning two of the fifteen RoC events at Pocono.  In 1992, the Race of Champions was moved to Flemington Raceway, where it stayed through 1995 with winners; Pauch, Boyd, Siscone and Blewett III. In 1996, the race moved to Oswego Speedway. Jan Leaty winning the year it moved, Tony Hirschman and Matt Hirschman are tied for number of wins at four at Oswego Speedway. Also for a brief one year period the Race of Champions Weekend was moved to Chemung Speedrome where Matt Hirschman won. In 2017 the Race of Champions weekend gained a title sponsor in Presque Isle Downs and was moved to Lake Erie Speedway in Erie, Pennsylvania. Matt Hirschman came out victorious once again, surpassing his father (Tony Hirschman) in wins at the event and is now fourth in all time wins at the event. The man to beat at the Race of Champions 250 continues to be Matt Hirschman as he wins his sixth Race of Champions 250 topping the all-time wins list at the event. This win was also his fourth in a row at the event.

History 
The Race of Champions is also a stock car racing series on both dirt and asphalt and was nominated for and won Best Touring Series on the 51's (which is an annual fan voted awards) for the 2017 season. The Race of Champions which is now a racing organization with many different series started out as one single race, the Race of Champions in which champions in modified racing from all over the country would come and try to qualify to race against the best which many were granted starting positions because of there achievements at other races or tracks. In the 2019 season a TQ Midget Series was introduced into the Race of Champions Group of Series. Andy Jankowiak became the inaugural series champion at Lake Erie Speedway.  Also in 2019 the Race of Champions began experimenting with sim racing via iRacing.com one of the most well known sim racing services

Current Asphalt Schedules

Asphalt Modifieds Series

Asphalt Sportsman Series

Asphalt Late Models Series

Asphalt Super Stocks Series

Asphalt TQ Midget Series

Asphalt Four-Cylinder Dash Series

Current Dirt Schedules

Dirt Sportsman

Past Champions

Past Race of Champions Race Winners

All Time Wins List (Modifieds Only)

References

External link

Stock car races
Auto racing organizations in the United States